This is a list of particular manifolds, by Wikipedia page. See also list of geometric topology topics. For categorical listings see :Category:Manifolds and its subcategories.

Generic families of manifolds

 Euclidean space, Rn
 n-sphere, Sn
 n-torus, Tn
 Real projective space, RPn
 Complex projective space, CPn
 Quaternionic projective space, HPn
 Flag manifold
 Grassmann manifold
 Stiefel manifold

Lie groups provide several interesting families. See Table of Lie groups for examples. See also: List of simple Lie groups and List of Lie group topics.

Manifolds of a specific dimension

1-manifolds

 Circle, S1
 Long line
 Real line, R
 Real projective line, RP1 ≅ S1

2-manifolds

 Cylinder, S1 × R
 Klein bottle, RP2 # RP2
 Klein quartic (a genus 3 surface)
 Möbius strip
 Real projective plane, RP2
 Sphere, S2
 Surface of genus g
 Torus
 Double torus

3-manifolds

 3-sphere, S3
 3-torus, T3
 Poincaré homology sphere
 SO(3) ≅ RP3
 Solid Klein bottle
 Solid torus
 Whitehead manifold
 Meyerhoff manifold
 Weeks manifold

For more examples see 3-manifold.

4-manifolds

 Complex projective plane
 Del Pezzo surface
 E8 manifold
 Enriques surface
 Exotic R4
 Hirzebruch surface
 K3 surface

For more examples see 4-manifold.

Special types of manifolds

Manifolds related to spheres

 Brieskorn manifold
 Exotic sphere
 Homology sphere
 Homotopy sphere
 Lens space
 Spherical 3-manifold

Special classes of Riemannian manifolds

 Einstein manifold
 Ricci-flat manifold
 G2 manifold
 Kähler manifold
 Calabi–Yau manifold
 Hyperkähler manifold
 Quaternionic Kähler manifold
 Riemannian symmetric space
 Spin(7) manifold

Categories of manifolds

Manifolds definable by a particular choice of atlas

 Affine manifold
 Analytic manifold
 Complex manifold
 Differentiable (smooth) manifold
 Piecewise linear manifold
 Lipschitz manifold
 Topological manifold

Manifolds with additional structure

 Almost complex manifold
 Almost symplectic manifold
 Calibrated manifold
 Complex manifold
 Contact manifold
 CR manifold
 Finsler manifold
 Hermitian manifold
 Hyperkähler manifold
 Kähler manifold
 Lie group
 Pseudo-Riemannian manifold
 Riemannian manifold
 Sasakian manifold
 Spin manifold
 Symplectic manifold

Infinite-dimensional manifolds

 Banach manifold
 Fréchet manifold
 Hilbert manifold

See also

References 

Manifolds